USS Algonquin (1863), a gunboat, was launched by the New York Navy Yard on 21 December 1863 but poor machinery caused her to fail her trials. Consequently, she was never commissioned and was sold on 21 October 1869.

References

 

 

Sassacus-class gunboats
1863 ships